Dryadosaura is a genus of the lizard family Gymnophthalmidae. The genus is monotypic, i.e. it has only one species, Dryadosaura nordestina. It occurs in Brazil.

References

Gymnophthalmidae
Monotypic lizard genera
Reptiles of Brazil
Endemic fauna of Brazil
Taxa named by Miguel Trefaut Rodrigues
Taxa named by Eliza Maria Xavier Freire
Taxa named by Kátia Cristina Machado Pellegrino
Taxa named by Jack W. Sites Jr.